Hypatima aridella is a moth in the family Gelechiidae. It was described by Francis Walker in 1864. It is found on Borneo.

Adults are pale testaceous (brick red), slender, smooth, shining, slightly silvery. The forewings are slightly rounded at the tips, with two irregular pale slate-coloured bands, which are accompanied by a few black points. The hindwings are cinereous (ash grey).

References

Hypatima
Moths described in 1864